Harald Krenchel (28 May 1884 – 9 January 1922) was a Danish fencer. He competed in the individual sabre event at the 1908 Summer Olympics.

References

1884 births
1922 deaths
Danish male fencers
Olympic fencers of Denmark
Fencers at the 1908 Summer Olympics